The 2014–15 Latvian Football Cup is the twentieth season of the Latvian annual football knock-out competition. The winners will qualify for the first qualifying round of the 2015–16 UEFA Europa League.

First round 
The matches of this round took place on 1 June 2014.

|-
!colspan="3" align="center"|1 June

|-
!colspan="3" align="center"|2 June

|-
!colspan="3" align="center"|5 June

|-
!colspan="3" align="center"|7 June

|-
!colspan="3" align="center"|8 June

|}

Second round 
The matches of this round took place on 12 June 2014.

|-
!colspan="3" align="center"|12 June

|-
!colspan="3" align="center"|14 June

|-
!colspan="3" align="center"|18 June

|-
!colspan="3" align="center"|19 June

|-
!colspan="3" align="center"|20 June

|-
!colspan="3" align="center"|21 June

|}

Third round 
The matches of this round took place on 5 July 2014.

|-
!colspan="3" align="center"|5 July

|-
!colspan="3" align="center"|6 July

|}

Fourth round 
The matches of this round took place on 12 July 2014.

|-
!colspan="3" align="center"|12 July

|-
!colspan="3" align="center"|13 July

|}

Round of 16 
The matches of this round took place on 19 July 2014.

|-
!colspan="3" align="center"|19 July

|-
!colspan="3" align="center"|20 July

|-
!colspan="3" align="center"|21 July

|-
!colspan="3" align="center"|7 October2

|}
1 LFF Disciplinary Committee awarded Ogre a 3–0 win due to Daugava Daugavpils fielding suspended player Aleksandrs Solovjovs. The original match had ended in a 3–1 win for Daugava Daugavpils.
2 due to FK Ventspils participation in the UEFA Champions League, the game took place on October 7.

Results

Quarterfinals 
The matches were played on 4 and 5 April 2015.

|-
!colspan="3" align="center"|TBA

|}

Semifinals
The matches were played on 25 and 26 April 2015.

|-

|}

Final
The match will be played on 20 May 2015.

|-

|}

References

External links 
 LFF.lv

Latvian Football Cup seasons
Latvian Football Cup
Cup
Cup